This is a list of journalists killed during the Somali Civil War, which began in 1988 and is ongoing.

Overview
According to the Committee to Protect Journalists (CPJ), an estimated 59 radio, print and television reporters operating within Somalia died in the period from the start of the civil war in 1992 to 2013. The CPJ estimated that the majority were locally based (73%), male (96%), broadcast journalists (45%), worked on the radio (65%), and were non-freelance (82%). Most were assassinated (65%), while covering primarily war (49%) and political stories (55%). A number also received threats prior to their deaths (22%). The sources of fire were largely political action groups (50%), mainly Al-Shabaab; the assailants' affiliations were unknown in only 22% of the cases. As a consequence, the country was described by Al-Jazeera as the most dangerous place in Africa for working journalists.

Early in the conflict, European journalists like Jean-Claude Jumel of France, Dan Eldon of the United Kingdom and Hansi Krauss of Germany were among those slain. The deadliest year for foreign correspondents in general was in 1993, according to the CPJ. The last foreign journalist to be killed in Somalia was Noramfaizul Mohd Nor of Malaysia, a cameraman with Bermana TV covering a relief operation.

Prior to the capital Mogadishu's pacification by the Somali National Army in mid-2011, the independent Radio Shabelle and HornAfrik Media Inc, among other Somali media outlets, were frequently targeted by Islamic militants. Among the casualties during this most volatile 2007-2011 period was Ali Iman Sharmarke, one of the founders of HornAfrik, who was killed in his role as director on 11 August 2007.

Since their ouster, the insurgents have resorted to issuing death threats and targeted assassinations in order to discourage reporting on their activities. Due to frustration at the increasing number of expatriate journalists returning to the capital after the relative improvement in security, the militants in 2012 intensified their anti-media campaign, killing a record 18 reporters during the year.

Jamal Osman, a journalist working for The Guardian (UK) and Channel 4, suggested in an October 2012 editorial that one of the factors behind the spate of killings of media workers in Somalia was graft amongst reporters. This was in sharp contrast to the widely held belief and CPJ data suggesting that the assassinations and death threats bore the hallmarks of the Islamist extremists. In a formal press statement, the National Union of Somali Journalists (NUSOJ) characterized Osman's editorial as "defamatory and libelous", and suggested that it represented a conscious effort to cast aspersions on the Somali media and was "an attempt to divert the public attention by aiding the real criminals, which could contribute the killing of Somali journalists to continue." The organization further indicated that "more than half of the cases took place in Mogadishu and all have been targeted in line with their profession and the majority of them have been claimed by the Shabab."

Despite the attempted intimidation, news outlets have continued to proliferate, with the number of radio and television stations in Mogadishu rising from 11 to 30 in less than five months. Journalists have also persisted in covering the war beat.

In early February 2013, the government launched an Independent Task Force on Human Rights tasked with investigating allegations of journalist intimidation and violence. Featuring a media representative, the 13-member committee is scheduled to publish a report on its findings and recommended courses of action at the end of its three-month mandate. The Task Force will eventually give way to a permanent parliamentary Human Rights Commission, which will have the capacity to investigate allegations over a longer period.

Journalists killed

See also

 Media of Somalia
 Somali Civil War

References

External links
National Union of Somali Journalists (NUSOJ)
Somali Exiled Journalists Association (SEJA) 
Somali Online Media and Journalists Association (SOMJA)
Sharmarke Foundation

Communications in Somalia
Human rights abuses in Somalia
Journalists killed while covering the Somali Civil War
Somalia